Flywheel, Shyster, and Flywheel is a situation comedy old-time radio show starring two of the Marx Brothers, Groucho and Chico, and written primarily by Nat Perrin and Arthur Sheekman. It was broadcast in the United States on the National Broadcasting Company's Blue Network to thirteen network affiliates in nine Eastern and Southern states. The show aired Monday nights at 7:30 p.m. beginning November 28, 1932, and ended May 22, 1933. It was the Monday night installment of the Five-Star Theater, a variety series that offered a different program each weeknight, and was sponsored by the Standard Oil Companies of New Jersey, Pennsylvania and Louisiana, to compete with Texaco's Fire Chief which starred Ed Wynn. Episodes were broadcast live from NBC's WJZ station in New York City and later from a sound stage at Radio Pictures in Los Angeles, California, before returning to WJZ for the final episodes.

The show depicted the misadventures of a small New York law firm, with Groucho acting as attorney Waldorf T. Flywheel (a crafty, and dishonest, lawyer), and Chico playing Flywheel's assistant Emmanuel Ravelli (a half-wit who can barely understand English, and who Flywheel uses as a fall guy). The series was titled Beagle, Shyster, and Beagle for the first three episodes, with Groucho's character initially called Waldorf T. Beagle, until a real lawyer from New York named Beagle contacted NBC and threatened a lawsuit unless it stopped using the name.

The show garnered respectable ratings for its early evening time slot, but did not return for a second season. The Co-Operative Analysis of Broadcasting (CAB) Rating for the show was 22.1% and placed 12th in the highest rated evening programs of the 1932–33 season. The CAB Rating was not disappointing – popular established shows such as The Shadow and The Adventures of Sherlock Holmes did not perform as well – but it was less than half the 44.8% CAB Rating of Fire Chief, which was sponsored by Standard Oil's rival Texaco and placed 3rd in the highest rated programs of the season.

There are twenty-six episodes of Flywheel, Shyster, and Flywheel. Each episode was introduced by the Blue Network announcer, and featured approximately fifteen-minutes of drama, ten minutes of orchestral music between acts, and concluded with a sixty-second skit promoting Esso and Essolube, performed by Groucho and Chico as themselves. The episodes were thought not to have been recorded, as was the practice at the time, but in the 1980s twenty-five of the twenty-six scripts were discovered in the Library of Congress. Adaptations of the recovered scripts were performed before modern audiences and then broadcast, on BBC Radio 4 in the UK, between 1990 and 1993. Subsequently, a recording of the 26th episode from the original 1932-33 series was discovered, which was then broadcast by the BBC in 2005.

Episodes

See also 
List of Flywheel, Shyster, and Flywheel (1990 radio series) episodes

Footnotes

Citations

References 

 

 

 

 

 

 

 

 

 

 

Lists of radio series episodes